The 1980–81 Biathlon World Cup was a multi-race tournament over a season of biathlon, organised by the UIPMB (Union Internationale de Pentathlon Moderne et Biathlon). The season started on 15 January 1981 in Jáchymov, Czechoslovakia, and ended on 5 April 1981 in Hedenäset, Sweden. It was the fourth season of the Biathlon World Cup, and it was only held for men.

Calendar
Below is the World Cup calendar for the 1980–81 season.

*The relays were technically unofficial races as they did not count towards anything in the World Cup.

World Cup Podium

Men

Standings: Men

Overall 

Final standings after 10 races.

Achievements
First World Cup career victory
, 24, in his 4th season — the WC 1 Individual in Jáchymov; first podium was 1978–79 Individual in Jáchymov
, 23, in his 3rd season — the WC 1 Sprint in Jáchymov; first podium was 1978–79 Individual in Sodankylä
, 21, in his 1st season — the WC 2 Individual in Antholz-Anterselva; it also was his first podium
, 23, in his 3rd season — the WC 3 Individual in Ruhpolding; first podium was 1978–79 Individual in Bardufoss
, 33, in his 4th season — the World Championships Individual in Lahti; first podium was 1977–78 Sprint in Sodankylä
, 24, in his 2nd season — the WC 4 Individual in Hedenäset; it also was his first podium

First World Cup podium
 — no. 2 in the WC 1 Individual in Jáchymov
, 25, in his 4th season — no. 3 in the WC 1 Individual in Jáchymov; it also was the first podium for an Czechoslovakian biathlete
, in his 3rd season — no. 2 in the WC 1 Sprint in Jáchymov
, 28, in his 2nd season — no. 3 in the WC 1 Sprint in Jáchymov; it also was the first podium for a Swedishbiathlete
, 23, in his 1st season — no. 2 in the WC 2 Individual in Antholz-Anterselva
 — no. 2 in the WC 2 Sprint in Antholz-Anterselva
, 22, in his 1st season — no. 3 in the WC 2 Sprint in Antholz-Anterselva
, 21, in his 2nd season — no. 2 in the WC 3 Sprint in Ruhpolding
, 26, in his 4th season — no. 3 in the World Championships Individual in Lahti
, 27, in his 2nd season — no. 3 in the WC 4 Individual in Hedenäset

Victory in this World Cup (all-time number of victories in parentheses)
, 2 (10) first places
, 2 (2) first places
, 1 (2) first place
, 1 (1) first place
, 1 (1) first place
, 1 (1) first place
, 1 (1) first place
, 1 (1) first place

Retirements
Following notable biathletes retired after the 1980–81 season:

References

Biathlon World Cup
World Cup